Socialist realism is a style of idealized realistic art that was developed in the Soviet Union and was the official style in that country between 1932 and 1988, as well as in other socialist countries after World War II. Socialist realism is characterized by the depiction of communist values, such as the emancipation of the proletariat. Despite its name, the figures in the style are very often highly idealized, especially in sculpture, where it often leans heavily on the conventions of classical sculpture. Although related, it should not be confused with social realism, a type of art that realistically depicts subjects of social concern, or other forms of "realism" in the visual arts. Socialist realism was made with an extremely literal and obvious meaning, usually showing an idealized USSR. Socialist realism was usually devoid of complex artistic meaning or interpretation.

Socialist realism was the predominant form of approved art in the Soviet Union from its development in the early 1920s to its eventual fall from official status beginning in the late 1960s until the breakup of the Soviet Union in 1991. While other countries have employed a prescribed canon of art, socialist realism in the Soviet Union persisted longer and was more restrictive than elsewhere in Europe.

History

Development 

Socialist realism was developed by many thousands of artists, across a diverse society, over several decades. Early examples of realism in Russian art include the work of the Peredvizhnikis and Ilya Yefimovich Repin. While these works do not have the same political connotation, they exhibit the techniques exercised by their successors. After the Bolsheviks took control of Russia on October 25, 1917, there was a marked shift in artistic styles. There had been a short period of artistic exploration in the time between the fall of the Tsar and the rise of the Bolsheviks.

Shortly after the Bolsheviks took control, Anatoly Lunacharsky was appointed as head of Narkompros, the People's Commissariat for Enlightenment. This put Lunacharsky in the position of deciding the direction of art in the newly created Soviet state. Although Lunacharsky did not dictate a single aesthetic model for Soviet artists to follow, he developed a system of aesthetics based on the human body that would later help to influence socialist realism. He believed that "the sight of a healthy body, intelligent face or friendly smile was essentially life-enhancing." He concluded that art had a direct effect on the human organism and under the right circumstances that effect could be positive. By depicting "the perfect person" (New Soviet man), Lunacharsky believed art could educate citizens on how to be the perfect Soviets.

Debate within Soviet art 

There were two main groups debating the fate of Soviet art: futurists and traditionalists. Russian Futurists, many of whom had been creating abstract or leftist art before the Bolsheviks, believed communism required a complete rupture from the past and, therefore, so did Soviet art. Traditionalists believed in the importance of realistic representations of everyday life. Under Lenin's rule and the New Economic Policy, there was a certain amount of private commercial enterprise, allowing both the futurists and the traditionalists to produce their art for individuals with capital. By 1928, the Soviet government had enough strength and authority to end private enterprises, thus ending support for fringe groups such as the futurists. At this point, although the term "socialist realism" was not being used, its defining characteristics became the norm.

According to the Great Russian Encyclopedia, the term was first used in press by chairman of the organizing committee of the Union of Soviet Writers, Ivan Gronsky in Literaturnaya Gazeta on May 23, 1932. The term was approved upon in meetings that included politicians of the highest level, including Joseph Stalin. Maxim Gorky, a proponent of literary socialist realism, published a famous article titled "Socialist Realism" in 1933. During the Congress of 1934, four guidelines were laid out for socialist realism. The work must be:
 Proletarian: art relevant to the workers and understandable to them.
 Typical: scenes of everyday life of the people.
 Realistic: in the representational sense.
 Partisan: supportive of the aims of the State and the Party.

Characteristics 

The purpose of socialist realism was to limit popular culture to a specific, highly regulated faction of emotional expression that promoted Soviet ideals. The party was of the utmost importance and was always to be favorably featured. The key concepts that developed assured loyalty to the party were partiinost' (party-mindedness), ideinost (idea- or ideological-content), klassovost (class content), pravdivost (truthfulness).

There was a prevailing sense of optimism, as socialist realism's function was to show the ideal Soviet society. Not only was the present glorified, but the future was also supposed to be depicted in an agreeable fashion. Because the present and the future were constantly idealized, socialist realism had a sense of forced optimism. Tragedy and negativity were not permitted, unless they were shown in a different time or place. This sentiment created what would later be dubbed "revolutionary romanticism".

Revolutionary romanticism elevated the common worker, whether factory or agricultural, by presenting his life, work, and recreation as admirable. Its purpose was to show how much the standard of living had improved thanks to the revolution, as educational information, to teach Soviet citizens how they should be acting and to improve morale.  The ultimate aim was to create what Lenin called "an entirely new type of human being": The New Soviet Man. Art (especially posters and murals) was a way to instill party values on a massive scale. Stalin described the socialist realist artists as "engineers of souls".

Common images used in socialist realism were flowers, sunlight, the body, youth, flight, industry, and new technology. These poetic images were used to show the utopianism of communism and the Soviet state. Art became more than an aesthetic pleasure; instead it served a very specific function. Soviet ideals placed functionality and work above all else; therefore, for art to be admired, it must serve a purpose. Georgi Plekhanov, a Marxist theoretician, states that art is useful if it serves society: "There can be no doubt that art acquired a social significance only in so far as it depicts, evokes, or conveys actions, emotions and events that are of significance to society."

The themes depicted would feature the beauty of work, the achievements of the collective and the individual for the good of the whole. The artwork would often feature an easily discernible educational message.

The artist could not, however, portray life just as they saw it because anything that reflected poorly on Communism had to be omitted. People who could not be shown as either wholly good or wholly evil could not be used as characters. Art was filled with health and happiness: paintings showed busy industrial and agricultural scenes; sculptures depicted workers, sentries, and schoolchildren.

Creativity was not an important part of socialist realism. The styles used in creating art during this period were those that would produce the most realistic results. Painters would depict happy, muscular peasants and workers in factories and collective farms. During the Stalin period, they produced numerous heroic portraits of Stalin to serve his cult of personality—all in the most realistic fashion possible. The most important thing for a socialist realist artist was not artistic integrity but adherence to party doctrine.

Important groups 

The Merriam-Webster Dictionary defines socialist realism as "a Marxist aesthetic theory calling for the didactic use of literature, art, and music to develop social consciousness in an evolving socialist state". Socialist realism compelled artists of all forms to create positive or uplifting reflections of socialist utopian life by utilizing any visual media, such as posters, movies, newspapers, theater and radio, beginning during the Communist Revolution of 1917 and escalating during the reign of Stalin until the early 1980s.

Vladimir Lenin, head of the Russian government 1917–1924, laid the foundation for this new wave of art, suggesting that art is for the people and the people should love and understand it, while uniting the masses. Artists Naum Gabo and Antoine Pevsner attempted to define the lines of art under Lenin by writing "The Realist Manifesto" in 1920, suggesting that artists should be given free rein to create as their muse desired. Lenin, however, had a different purpose for art: wanting it functional, and Stalin built on that belief that art should be agitation.

The term Socialist Realism was proclaimed in 1934 at the Soviet Writer's congress, although it was left not precisely defined. This turned individual artists and their works into state-controlled propaganda.

After the death of Stalin in 1953, he was succeeded by Nikita Khrushchev who allowed for less draconian state controls and openly condemned Stalin's artistic demands in 1956 with his "Secret Speech", and thus began a reversal in policy known as "Khrushchev's Thaw". He believed that artists should not be constrained and should be allowed to live by their creative talents. In 1964, Khrushchev was removed and replaced by Leonid Brezhnev, who reintroduced Stalin's ideas and reversed the artistic decisions made by Khrushchev.

However, by the early 1980s, the Socialist Realist movement had begun to fade. Artists to date remark that the Russian Social Realist movement as the most oppressive and shunned period of Soviet Art.

Association of Artists of Revolutionary Russia (AKhRR) 
The Association of Artists of Revolutionary Russia (AKhRR) was established in 1922 and was one of the most influential artist groups in the USSR. The AKhRR worked to truthfully document contemporary life in Russia by utilizing "heroic realism". The term "heroic realism" was the beginning of the socialist realism archetype. AKhRR was sponsored by influential government officials such as Leon Trotsky and carried favor with the Red Army.

In 1928, the AKhRR was renamed to Association of Artists of the Revolution (AKhR) in order to include the rest of the Soviet states. At this point the group had begun participating in state promoted mass forms of art like murals, jointly-made paintings, advertisement production and textile design. The group was disbanded April 23, 1932 by the decree "On the Reorganization of Literary and Artistic Organizations" serving as the nucleus for the Stalinist USSR Union of Artists.

Studio of military artists named after M. B. Grekov 

Studio of military artists was created in 1934.

The Union of Soviet Writers (USW) 
The creation of Union of Soviet Writers was partially initiated by Maxim Gorky to unite the Soviet writers of different methods, such as the "proletarian" writers (such as Fyodor Panfyorov), praised by the Communist Party, and the poputchicks (such as Boris Pasternak and Andrei Bely). In August 1934, the union held its first congress where Gorky said: 

One of the most famous authors during this time was Alexander Fadeyev. Fadeyev was a close personal friend of Stalin and called Stalin "one of the greatest humanists the world has ever seen." His most famous works include The Rout and The Young Guard.

Impact 

The impact of socialist realist art can still be seen decades after it ceased being the only state-supported style. Even before the end of the USSR in 1991, the government had been reducing its practices of censorship. After Stalin's death in 1953, Nikita Khrushchev began to condemn the previous regime's practice of excessive restrictions. This freedom allowed artists to begin experimenting with new techniques, but the shift was not immediate. It was not until the ultimate fall of Soviet rule that artists were no longer restricted by the deposed Communist Party. Many socialist realist tendencies prevailed until the mid-to-late 1990s and early 2000s.

In the 1990s, many Russian artists used the characteristics of socialist realism in an ironic fashion. This was completely different from what existed only a couple of decades before. Once artists broke from the socialist realist mould, there was a significant power shift. Artists began including subjects that could not exist according to Soviet ideals. Now that the power over appearances was taken away from the government, artists achieved a level of authority that had not existed since the early 20th century. In the decade immediately after the fall of the USSR, artists represented socialist realism and the Soviet legacy as a traumatic event. By the next decade, there was a unique sense of detachment.

Western cultures often do not look at socialist realism positively. Democratic countries view the art produced during this period of repression as a lie. Non-Marxist art historians tend to view communism as a form of totalitarianism that smothers artistic expression and therefore retards the progress of culture. In recent years there has been a reclamation of the movement in Moscow with the addition of the Institute of Russian Realist Art (IRRA), a three-story museum dedicated to preserving 20th-century Russian realist paintings.

Notable works and artists

Music 

Hanns Eisler composed many workers' songs, marches, and ballads on current political topics such as Song of Solidarity, Song of the United Front, and Song of the Comintern. He was a founder of a new style of revolutionary song for the masses. He also composed works in larger forms such as Requiem for Lenin. Eisler's most important works include the cantatas German Symphony, Serenade of the Age and Song of Peace. Eisler combines features of revolutionary songs with varied expression. His symphonic music is known for its complex and subtle orchestration.

Closely associated with the rise of the labor movement was the development of the revolutionary song, which was performed at demonstrations and meetings. Among the most famous of the revolutionary songs are The Internationale and Whirlwinds of Danger. Notable songs from Russia include Boldly, Comrades, in Step, Workers' Marseillaise, and Rage, Tyrants. Folk and revolutionary songs influenced the Soviet mass songs. The mass song was a leading genre in Soviet music, especially during the 1930s and the war. The mass song influenced other genres, including the art song, opera, and film music. The most popular mass songs include Dunaevsky's Song of the Homeland, Isaakovsky's Katiusha, Novikov's Hymn of Democratic Youth of the World, and Aleksandrov's Sacred War.

Film 
In the early 1930s, Soviet filmmakers applied socialist realism in their work. Notable films include Chapaev, which shows the role of the people in the history-making process. The theme of revolutionary history was developed in films such as The Youth of Maxim by Grigori Kozintsev and Leonid Trauberg, Shchors by Dovzhenko, and We are from Kronstadt by E. Dzigan. The shaping of the new man under socialism was a theme of films such as A Start Life by N. Ekk, Ivan by Dovzhenko, Valerii Chkalov by M. Kalatozov and the film version of Tanker "Derbent" (1941). Some films depicted the part of peoples of the Soviet Union against foreign invaders: Alexander Nevsky by Eisenstein, Minin and Pozharsky by Pudovkin, and Bogdan Khmelnitsky by Savchenko. Soviet politicians were the subjects in films such as Yutkevich's trilogy of movies about Lenin.

Socialist realism was also applied to Hindi films of the 1940s and 1950s. These include Chetan Anand's Neecha Nagar (1946), which won the Grand Prize at the 1st Cannes Film Festival, and Bimal Roy's Two Acres of Land (1953), which won the International Prize at the 7th Cannes Film Festival.

Paintings 
The painter Aleksandr Deineka provides a notable example for his expressionist and patriotic scenes of the Second World War, collective farms, and sports. Yuriy Ivanovich Pimenov, Boris Ioganson and Geli Korzev have also been described as "unappreciated masters of twentieth-century realism". Another well-known practitioner was Fyodor Pavlovich Reshetnikov.

Socialist realist art found acceptance in the Baltic nations, inspiring many artists. One such artist was Czeslaw Znamierowski (23 May 1890 – 9 August 1977), a Soviet Lithuanian painter, known for his large panoramic landscapes and love of nature. Znamierowski combined these two passions to create very notable paintings in the Soviet Union, earning the prestigious title of Honorable Artist of LSSR in 1965. Born in Latvia, which formed part of the Russian Empire at the time, Znamierowski was of Polish descent and Lithuanian citizenship, a country where he lived for most of his life and died. He excelled in landscapes and social realism, and held many exhibitions. Znamierowski was also widely published in national newspapers, magazines and books. His more notable paintings include Before Rain (1930), Panorama of Vilnius City (1950), The Green Lake (1955), and In Klaipeda Fishing Port (1959). A large collection of his art is located in the Lithuanian Art Museum.

Literature 
Martin Andersen Nexø developed socialist realism in his own way. His creative method featured a combination of publicistic passion, a critical view of capitalist society, and a steadfast striving to bring reality into accord with socialist ideals. The novel Pelle, the Conqueror is considered to be a classic of socialist realism. The novel Ditte, Daughter of Man had a working-class woman as its heroine. He battled against the enemies of socialism in the books Two Worlds, and Hands Off!.

The novels of Louis Aragon, such as The Real World, depict the working class as a rising force of the nation. He published two books of documentary prose, The Communist Man. In the collection of poems A Knife in the Heart Again, Aragon criticizes the penetration of American imperialism into Europe. The novel The Holy Week depicts the artist's path toward the people against a broad social and historical background.

Maxim Gorky's novel Mother (1906) is usually considered  to have been the first socialist-realist novel. Gorky was also a major factor in the school's rapid rise, and his pamphlet, On Socialist Realism, essentially lays out the needs of Soviet art. Other important works of literature include Fyodor Gladkov's Cement (1925), Nikolai Ostrovsky's How the Steel Was Tempered (1936) and Aleksey Tolstoy's epic trilogy The Road to Calvary (1922–1941). Yury Krymov's novel Tanker "Derbent" (1938) portrays Soviet merchant seafarers being transformed by the Stakhanovite movement.

Thol, a novel by D. Selvaraj in Tamil is a standing example of Marxist Realism in India. It won a literary award (Sahithya Akademi) for the year 2012.

Sculptures 
Sculptor Fritz Cremer created a series of monuments commemorating the victims of the National Socialist regime in the former concentration camps Auschwitz, Buchenwald, Mauthausen and Ravensbrück. His bronze monument in Buchenwald, depicting the liberation of this concentration camp by detainees in April 1945, is considered one of the most striking examples of socialist realism in GDR sculpture for its representation of communist liberation.

Each figure in the monument, erected outside the campsite, has symbolic significance according to the orthodox communist interpretation of the event. Thus communists were portrayed as the driving force behind self-liberation, symbolized by a figure in the foreground sacrificing himself for his sufferers, followed by the central group of determined comrades through whose courage and fearlessness is encouraged. The German Democratic Republic used these sculptures to reaffirm its claim to the historical and political legacy of the anti-fascist struggle for freedom.

Bruno Apitz's novel Nackt unter Wölfen, a story that culminates in the vivid description of the self-liberation of the detainees, was deliberately chosen to take place on the same day as the formal opening of the Buchenwald Monument in September 1958.

Soviet Union 

In conjunction with the Socialist Classical style of architecture, socialist realism was the officially approved type of art in the Soviet Union for more than fifty years.

In the early years of the Soviet Union, Russian and Soviet artists embraced a wide variety of art forms under the auspices of Proletkult. Revolutionary politics and radical non-traditional art forms were seen as complementary. In art, Constructivism flourished. In poetry, the non-traditional and the avant-garde were often praised.

These styles of art were later rejected by members of the Communist Party who did not appreciate modern styles such as Impressionism and Cubism. Socialist realism was, to some extent, a reaction against the adoption of these "decadent" styles. It was thought by Lenin that the non-representative forms of art were not understood by the proletariat and could therefore not be used by the state for propaganda.

Alexander Bogdanov argued that the radical reformation of society to communist principles meant little if any bourgeois art would prove useful; some of his more radical followers advocated the destruction of libraries and museums. Lenin rejected this philosophy, deplored the rejection of the beautiful because it was old, and explicitly described art as needing to call on its heritage: "Proletarian culture must be the logical development of the store of knowledge mankind has accumulated under the yoke of capitalist, landowner, and bureaucratic society."

Modern art styles appeared to refuse to draw upon this heritage, thus clashing with the long realist tradition in Russia and rendering the art scene complex. Even in Lenin's time, a cultural bureaucracy began to restrain art to fit propaganda purposes. Leon Trotsky's arguments that a "proletarian literature" was un-Marxist because the proletariat would lose its class characteristics in the transition to a classless society, however, did not prevail.

Socialist realism became state policy in 1934 when the First Congress of Soviet Writers met and Stalin's representative Andrei Zhdanov gave a speech strongly endorsing it as "the official style of Soviet culture". It was enforced ruthlessly in all spheres of artistic endeavour. Form and content were often limited, with erotic, religious, abstract, surrealist, and expressionist art being forbidden. Formal experiments, including internal dialogue, stream of consciousness, nonsense, free-form association, and cut-up were also disallowed. This was either because they were "decadent", unintelligible to the proletariat, or counter-revolutionary.

Art exhibitions of 1935–1940 serve as counterpoint to claims that the artistic life of the period was suppressed by the ideology and artists submitted entirely to what was then called "social order". A great number of landscapes, portraits, and genre paintings exhibited at the time pursued purely technical purposes and were thus ostensibly free from any ideology. Genre painting was also approached in a similar way.

Their time and contemporaries, with all its images, ideas, and dispositions found it full expression in portraits by Vladimir Gorb, Boris Korneev, Engels Kozlov, Felix Lembersky, Oleg Lomakin, Samuil Nevelshtein, Victor Oreshnikov, Semion Rotnitsky, Lev Russov, and Leonid Steele; in landscapes by Nikolai Galakhov, Vasily Golubev, Dmitry Maevsky, Sergei Osipov, Vladimir Ovchinnikov, Alexander Semionov, Arseny Semionov, and Nikolai Timkov; and in genre paintings by Andrey Milnikov, Yevsey Moiseenko, Mikhail Natarevich, Yuri Neprintsev, Nikolai Pozdneev, Mikhail Trufanov, Yuri Tulin, Nina Veselova, and others.

In 1974, for instance, a show of unofficial art in a field near Moscow was broken up and the artwork destroyed with a water cannon and bulldozers (see Bulldozer Exhibition). Mikhail Gorbachev's policies of glasnost and perestroika facilitated an explosion of interest in alternative art styles in the late 1980s, but socialist realism remained in limited force as the official state art style until as late as 1991. It was not until after the fall of the Soviet Union that artists were finally freed from state censorship.

Other countries 

After the Russian Revolution, socialist realism became an international literary movement. Socialist trends in literature were established in the 1920s in Germany, France, Czechoslovakia, and Poland. Writers who helped develop socialist realism in the West included Louis Aragon, Johannes Becher, and Pablo Neruda.

During the 1950s, this massive undertaking, a crucial role fell to architects perceived not as merely engineers creating streets and edifices, but rather as "engineers of the human soul" who, in addition to extending simple aesthetics into urban design, were to express grandiose ideas and arouse feelings of stability, persistence and political power.

In art, from the mid-1960s more relaxed and decorative styles became acceptable even in large public works in the Warsaw Pact bloc, the style mostly deriving from popular posters, illustrations and other works on paper, with discreet influence from their Western equivalents.

Today, arguably the only countries still focused on these aesthetic principles are North Korea, Laos, and to some extent Vietnam. Socialist realism had little mainstream impact in the non-Communist world, where it was widely seen as a totalitarian means of imposing state control on artists.

The former Socialist Federal Republic of Yugoslavia was an important exception among the communist countries, because after the Tito–Stalin split in 1948, it abandoned socialist realism along with other elements previously imported from the Soviet system and allowed greater artistic freedom. 

Socialist realism was the main art current in the People's Socialist Republic of Albania. In 2017, three works by Albanian artists from the socialist era were exhibited at documenta 14.

China 
Academics typically view China's socialist literature as existing within the trend of Stalinist-influenced socialist realism, particularly major works such as Mikhail Sholokov's Virgin Soil Upturned and Galina Nikolaeva's Harvest which were widely translated and disseminated in China. Other academics, including Cai Xiang, Rebecca E. Karl, and Xueping Zhong, place greater weight on the influence of Mao Zedong's 1942 lectures, "Talks at the Yan'an Forum on Art and Literature." 

China currently adopts socialist realism for specific purposes, such as idealised propaganda posters to promote the Chinese space program.

Gender in socialist realism

USSR

Early Soviet period 

In the poster propaganda produced during the Russian Civil War (1917–1922) men were overrepresented as workers, peasants, and combat heroes, and when women were shown, it was often either to symbolize an abstract concept (Ex. Mother Russia, "freedom") or as nurses and victims. The symbolic women would be depicted as femininewearing long dresses, long hair, and bare breasts. The image of the urban proletariat, the group which brought the Bolsheviks to power was characterized by masculinity, physical strength, and dignity and were usually shown as blacksmiths.

In 1920, Soviet artists began to produce the first images of women proletarians. These women differed from the symbolic women from the 1910s in that they most closely resembled the aspects of the male workersdignity, masculinity, and even supernatural power in the case of blacksmiths. In many paintings in the 1920s, the men and women were almost indistinguishable in stature and clothing, but the women would often be depicted taking subservient roles to the men, such as being his assistant ("rabotnitsa"). These women blacksmith figures were less common, but significant, since it was the first time women were represented as proletarians. The introduction of women workers in propaganda coincided with a series of government policies which allowed for divorce, abortion, and more sexual freedom.

Peasant women were also rarely depicted in socialist propaganda art in the period before 1920. The typical image of a peasant was a bearded, sandal-shoed man in shoddy clothes and with a scythe, until 1920, when artists began to create peasant women, who were usually buxom, full-bodied, with a scarf tied around their head. The image of peasant women was not always positive; they often would evoke the derogatory caricature "baba", which was used against peasant women and women in general.

As is discussed above, the art style during the early period of the Soviet Union (1917-1930) differed from the Socialist Realist art created during the Stalinist period. Artists were able to experiment more freely with the message of the revolution. Many Soviet artists during this period were part of the constructivist movement and used abstract forms for propaganda posters, while some chose to use a realist style. Women artists were significantly represented in the revolutionary avant garde movement, which began before 1917 and some of the most famous were Alexandra Exter, Natalia Goncharova, Liubov Popova, Varvara Stepanova, Olga Rozanova and Nadezhda Udaltsova. These women challenged some of the historical precedents of male dominance in art. The historian Christina Kiaer has argued that the move away from market based forms of art production after the revolution benefited female artists' careers, especially before 1930 when the Association of Artists of Revolutionary Russia (AKhRR) was still relatively egalitarian. Instead of an elite, individualistic group of disproportionately male "geniuses" produced by the market, artists shared in the creation of a common vision.

Stalin era 
The style of socialist realism began to dominate the Soviet artistic community starting when Stalin rose to power in 1930, and the government took a more active role in regulating art creation. The AKhRR became more hierarchical and the association privileged realist style oil paintings, a field dominated by men, over posters and other mediums in which women had primarily worked. The task of Soviet artists was to create visualisations of the "New Soviet Man"the idealized icon of humanity living under socialism. This heroic figure encapsulated both men and women, per the Russian word "chelovek", a masculine term meaning "person". While the new Soviet person could be male or female, the figure of man was often used to represent gender neutrality.

Because the government had declared the "woman question" resolved in 1930, there was little explicit discourse about how women should be uniquely created in art. Discussions of gender difference and sexuality were generally taboo and viewed as a distraction from the duties people had to the creation of socialism. Accordingly, nudes of both men and women were rare, and some art critics have pointed out that Socialist Realist paintings escaped the problem of women's sexual objectification commonly seen in capitalist forms of art production. But the declaration of women's equality also made it difficult to talk about the gender inequality that did exist; Stalin's government had simultaneously banned abortion and homosexuality, made divorce more difficult, and dismantled the women's associations in government (Zhenotdels). The "New Soviet Woman" was often shown working in traditionally male jobs, such as aviation, engineering, tractor-driving, and politics. The point of this was to encourage women to join the workforce and show off the strides the USSR had made for women, especially in comparison with the United States. Indeed, women had expanded opportunities to take up traditionally male jobs in comparison to the US. In 1950, women made up 51.8% of the Soviet labor force, compared to just 28.3% in North America.

However, there were also many patriarchal depictions of women. Historian Susan Reid has argued that the cult of personality around male Soviet leaders created an entire atmosphere of patriarchy in Socialist Realist art, where both male and female workers often looked up to the "father" icon of Lenin and Stalin. Furthermore, the policies of the 1930s ended up forcing many women to be solely responsible for childcare, leaving them with the famous "double burden" of childcare and work duties. The government encouraged women to have children by creating portraits of the "housewife-activist"wives and mothers who supported their husbands and the socialist state by taking on unpaid housework and childcare.

Women were also more often shown as peasants than workers, which some scholars see as evidence of their perceived inferiority. Art depicting peasant women in the Stalin era was far more positive than in the 1920s, and often explicitly pushed back against the "baba" stereotype. However, the peasantry, still living in feudal society, was generally seen as backwards, and did not hold the same status as the heroic status as the revolutionary urban proletariat. An example of the gender distinction of male proletariat and female peasantry is Vera Muhkina’s statue Worker and Kolkhoz Woman (1937), where the worker is shown as male, while the collective farm worker is female.

Painting

Sculpture

Relief

See also 

 Capitalist realism
 Fine Art of Leningrad
 Heroic realism
 Propaganda in the Soviet Union
 Socialist realism in Poland
 Socialist realism in Romania
 Zhdanov Doctrine

References

Further reading 
 Bek, Mikuláš; Chew, Geoffrey; and Macel, Petr (eds.). Socialist Realism and Music. Musicological Colloquium at the Brno International Music Festival 36. Prague: KLP; Brno: Institute of Musicology, Masaryk University, 2004. 
 Golomstock, Igor. Totalitarian Art in the Soviet Union, the Third Reich, Fascist Italy and the People's Republic of China, HarperCollins, 1990.
 James, C. Vaughan. Soviet Socialist Realism: Origins and Theory. New York: St. Martin's Press, 1973.
 Ivanov, Sergei. Unknown Socialist Realism. The Leningrad School. Saint Petersburg, NP-Print, 2007 
 Lin Jung-hua. Post-Soviet Aestheticians Rethinking Russianization and Chinization of Marxism (Russian Language and Literature Studies. Serial No. 33) Beijing, Capital Normal University, 2011, No.3. Р.46-53.
 Prokhorov, Gleb. Art under Socialist Realism: Soviet Painting, 1930–1950. East Roseville, NSW, Australia: Craftsman House; G + B Arts International, 1995. 
 Rideout, Walter B. The Radical Novel in the United States: 1900–1954. Some Interrelations of Literature and Society. New York: Hill and Wang, 1966.
 Saehrendt, Christian. Kunst als Botschafter einer künstlichen Nation ("Art from an artificial nation – about modern art as a tool of the GDR's propaganda"), Stuttgart 2009
 Sinyavsky, Andrei [writing as Abram Tertz]. "The Trial Begins" and "On Socialist Realism", translated by Max Hayward and George Dennis, with an introduction by Czesław Miłosz. Berkeley: University of California Press, 1960–1982. 
 The Leningrad School of Painting. Essays on the History. St Petersburg, ARKA Gallery Publishing, 2019. 
 Origin of Socialist Realism in Russia and China. Translation and revised version of “Las noches rusas y el origen del realismo socialista.”

External links 

 Moderna Museet in Stockholm, Sweden: Socialist Realist Art Conference
 Marxists.org Socialist Realism page
 Virtual Museum of Political Art – Socialist Realism
 Research Guide to Russian Art
 Socialist realism: Socialist in content, capitalist in price

 
Leninism
Film styles
Socialism
Realism (art movement)
Art movements
Propaganda art
Soviet painters
Censorship in the Soviet Union
Propaganda in the Soviet Union